Snow Creek Township is one of nine townships in Stokes County, North Carolina, United States. The township had a population of 2,653 according to the 2000 census.

Geographically, Snow Creek Township occupies  in northeastern Stokes County.  The township's eastern border is with Rockingham County and the northern border is with the state of Virginia. There are no incorporated municipalities in Snow Creek Township but there are several unincorporated communities, including Delta, Oak Ridge, and Sandy Ridge.

References

Townships in Stokes County, North Carolina
Townships in North Carolina